The Aliʻi nui of Maui was the supreme ruler of the islands of Maui, one of the four main Hawaiian Islands as well as the smaller island of Lanai. The title is the same as that of the Alii nui of the other islands. The title or phrase Mōʻī is sometimes used for the title of the monarchs of Maui; however, it is not an ancient word in the Hawaiian language and has origins in the mid 19th century. The only monarchs to officially hold the title of Mōʻī are Kalākaua and his sister Liliuokalani.

Overview 
The monarchs of Maui, like those of the other Hawaiian islands, claim descent from Wākea and Papa. They were sometimes referred to as Mōī beginning in the mid 19th century, and would later become commonly translated from the Hawaiian language into English as the word "king".
Paumakua, the first ruler of Maui, was thirty-first in line of descent from Wakea. In the beginning, from about Paumakua of Maui down to Kawaokaohele's reign, the Alii nui of Maui only controlled the much larger western portion of the island while the chiefs of Hana remained independent. Mauiloa had tried to unite the island once, but troubles with the Hana chief continued. It was under Piʻilani's reign that he conquered the east and united Maui for the first time.

Kahekili II expanded his empire by conquering the neighbouring island of Oahu in 1783 and through marriage of his brother allied himself with the Queen of Kauai. However, his son Kalanikūpule was the last of his line. Maui was weakened when Kalanikupule and his uncle, Kaeokulani, fought over the succession to the throne. Maui along with Oahu fell to Kamehameha I in 1795 and ushered in the Kingdom of Hawaii.

Alii nui of Maui
Alii nui Piʻilani
Alii nui Lono-a-Pi'ilani 
Alii nui Kiha-a-Pi'ilani 
Alii nui Kamalalawalu 
Alii nui Kauhiakama 
Alii nui Kalanikaumakaowākea 
Alii nui Lonohonuakini 17th century
Alii nui Kaulahea II 
Alii nui Kekaulike  1700s–1736
Alii nui Kamehamehanui Ailuau  1736–1765
Alii nui Kahekili II  1765–1794
Alii nui Kaeokulani  1794
Alii nui Kalanikūpule of Maui and Oahu 1794–1795 *Incorporated into Kamehameha I's kingdom

Hāna 
During the early years of the Kingdom of Maui the island was divided in half. The much larger western side was under the rule of the descendants of Paumakua, and East Maui, comprising the districts of Koolau, Hāna, Kipahulu, and Kaupo, was at times under independent rulers. The monarchs of Hāna, like those of the other Hawaiian chiefdom, probably claimed descent from Wakea and Pāpa. These monarchs were in some sense district chiefs and vassals of the Western rulers of Maui. From Eleio to Hoolae the king of Hāna remained mostly free from West Maui under Kakaalaneo to Kawaokaohele. The sixth Alii Nui of Hāna, Hoolae, became a subject of Piʻilani and even allowed his daughter to marry him. The Kings of Hāna's allegiance to the West Maui Mōī were always precarious, even in later times after Piilani's conquest. The main strategic advantage of the Kings of Hāna was their command of the fortress of Kauwiki, considered impregnable.

Hāna chiefs
Alii nui Eleio of Hāna during the reign of Kakaalaneo
Alii nui Kalahaeha of Hāna
Alii nui Lei of Hāna
Alii nui Kamohohalii of Hāna
Alii nui Kalaehina of Hāna
Alii nui Hoolae of Hāna

See also
 History of Maui
Ancient Hawaii
Kingdom of Hawaii
Alii Aimoku of Kauai
Alii Aimoku of Molokai
Alii Aimoku of Hawaii
Alii Aimoku of Oahu
Governors of Maui
Maui County, Hawaii

References

External links
 
 Hawaiian Roots: Maui Kings

 
Maui
Native Hawaiian people
Lists of people from Hawaii
Hawaiian monarchs
Polynesian titles